Silphium is an unidentified plant recorded in classical antiquity, believed extinct.

Silphium or Silphion can also refer to:

Silphium (genus) of North American daisies in the family Asteraceae known as "rosinweeds"
Silphion (insect), an extinct protorthopteran insect genus in the family Anthracothremmidae

See also
 Silpium, a mountain in Greek mythology